Annette Lilja Vilhelmsen (born 24 October 1959) is a Danish politician who served as chairperson of the Socialist People's Party from 2012 to 2014. She served as Minister for Social Affairs and Integration from August 2013 to February 2014 and Minister for Economic and Business Affairs from 2012 to 2013 in the first cabinet of Helle Thorning-Schmidt. She was a member of Folketing from 2011 to 2015.

Political career
Born in Svendborg, she was educated as a teacher and had a long career in teaching combined with local politics before entering the national political scene when she was elected to Parliament in the 2011 elections. She became her party's spokeswoman for Business related issues.

In September 2012 she announced her candidacy for the post as head of the Socialist People's Party running against Astrid Krag after the previous leader Villy Søvndal stepped down. Vilhelmsen is said to represent the party's left wing. While most of the party leadership voiced their support for Krag and warned that Vilhelmsen's leftist line might endanger the stability of the government coalition, Vilhelmsen achieved considerable support in the general constituency of the party, and won the election with 66% of the vote.

On 16 October 2012 she was named new Minister of Economic and Business Affairs succeeding Ole Sohn. She retracted from both her post as Minister and chairman of the party on 30 January 2014 following lack of support from the party grassroots in the high-profile case of selling part of Danish energy company DONG to American Goldman-Sachs.

References

1959 births
Living people
Members of the Folketing 2011–2015
Government ministers of Denmark
Socialist People's Party (Denmark) politicians
People from Svendborg
21st-century Danish women politicians
Women government ministers of Denmark
Women members of the Folketing
Leaders of the Socialist People's Party (Denmark)